NK Dinara is a football club based in the town of Knin, Croatia, which competes in the 1. ŽNL, the fourth tier of the Croatian football league system.

Notable former players
 Radomir Vukčević

References

External links

Nogometni leksikon

Football clubs in Croatia
Football clubs in Šibenik-Knin County
Association football clubs established in 1913
1913 establishments in Croatia